Andy Winter is the name of:

Andy Winter (comics), British comic writer
Andy Winter (footballer) (born 2002), Scottish footballer
Andy Winter (musician), Norwegian musician

See also
Andrew Winter (disambiguation)